Giorgio Jan (21 December 1791 in Vienna – 8 May 1866, Milan) was an Italian taxonomist, zoologist, botanist, herpetologist, and writer. He is also known as Georg Jan or Georges Jan. He was the first director of the natural history museum at Milan.

Biography

After having been an assistant at the University of Vienna, Jan obtained the post of professor of botany at the university of Parma as well as becoming Director of the botanical garden. At that time, the duchy of Parma was no longer under Austrian jurisdiction following the Congress of Vienna after the defeat of Napoleon at Waterloo. Giuseppe de Cristoforis died in 1837 bequeathing his collections to the town of Milan on condition that the municipality created a natural history museum whose direction had to be entrusted to Giorgio Jan, who offered his own collections. The Museo Civico di Storia Naturale di Milano was created the following year and is the oldest natural history museum of Italy. Jan immediately engaged Ferdinando Sordelli (1837–1916), artist and naturalist, who then illustrated his publications.

Jan's main interest was botany, but he made immense collections of natural history, including fossils and minerals. With Giuseppe de Cristoforis, he published many catalogues of specimens, often offered for sale or exchange. In these many new species, were described mainly insects and molluscs.

In the scientific field of herpetology he is credited with having described more than 85 new species of snakes, and is honored by having several species and subspecies named after him, such as the Texas night snake (Hypsiglena torquata jani ), the Mexican pine snake (Pituophis deppei jani ), Jan's shovelsnout snake (Prosymna janii, and Jan's centipede snake (Tantilla jani ). In the 1860s he began compiling what was to become the Iconographie Général des Ophidiens, an extensive illustrated collection of scientific papers relating to snakes, but he died before it was completed. The work was eventually finished and published in several parts by Sordelli.

Publications (incomplete list)

Iconographie Générale des Ophidians (1860–1866). (in French).

References

Further reading
Conci, Cesare (1966). "Il centenario di Giorgio Jan, la sua attività malacologica e le collezioni di Molluschi del Museo Civico di Storia Naturale di Milano". Lavori della Società Malacologica Italiana 3: 1–8. (in Italian).
Conci, Cesare (1978). Il Museo Civico di Storia Naturale di Milano. Milan: Banca Popolare di Milano. (in Italian).
Conci, Cesare (1984). Museo Civico di Storia Naturale di Milano, Musaeum Septalianum una collezione scientifica nella Milano del Seicento a cura di Antonio Aimi, Vincenzo De Michele, Alessandro Morandotti. Florence: Giunti Marzocco. (in Italian).

External links
Museo Civico di Storia Naturale Milano  (in Italian).
 Elenco sistematico degli ofidi descritti e disegnati per l'iconografia generale (1863)
 Iconographie générale des ophidiens (1860-1881)
 Gaedike R, Groll EK, Taeger A (2012). Bibliography of the literature on entomology from the beginning until 1863 : online database - version 1.0 - Senckenberg Deutsches Entomologisches Institut.

Italian entomologists
19th-century Italian botanists
Italian zoologists
Scientists from Vienna
Academic staff of the University of Vienna
Academic staff of the University of Parma
1791 births
1866 deaths